This is a list of all managers of İstanbul Başakşehir, including honours.

Managers

Records

Nationalities

Most games managed

References

Notes

External links
Official website

 
Istanbul Basaksehir